San José Unified School District (abbreviated SJUSD) is a TK-12 unified school district in Santa Clara County, California, that covers a large portion of the city of San Jose. The district has more than 3,000 full-time employees serving approximately 30,000 students in 41 schools from Downtown San Jose in the north to the Almaden Valley in the south. It is one of 19 school districts that serve parts of San Jose, the largest school district in the Santa Clara Valley, and the 24th largest in California.

History
San José Unified School District was established in 1853 as the San Jose City School District. The district adopted its present name in 1936.

In 1863, the district opened San Jose High School, the second-oldest public high school in California. In 1953, the district took over operation of San Jose City College from San Jose State College.

State law originally required school districts to be coterminous with city limits. San Jose's rapid expansion under city manager Dutch Hamann caused territory to be transferred to the San José Unified School District from the surrounding rural school districts. The rural districts used lawsuits to delay or block annexations in an attempt to preserve their tax bases. In 1954, the state passed a law allowing school districts to have distinct boundaries from cities, mostly confining San José Unified School District to its boundaries at the time. Christensen (2015) cites the resulting hodgepodge of school districts within San Jose as a contributing factor in the city's "fragmented politics, lack of identity and racial segregation". The law also required certain elementary districts to either build their own high school or be annexed by a district that already had a high school. Thus, in 1956, the voters in Almaden Union School District elected to merge with San José Unified.

In 1971, parents in San Jose filed suit against the school district to force school integration. The district claimed that any racial segregation was due to housing patterns, not explicit policy. However, in 1984, the United States District Court for the Northern District of California issued a desegregation order for the school district, embarrassing local officials. The district responded by opening magnet schools and busing students.

In 1983, federal bankruptcy judge Seymour Abrahams declared the school board bankrupt under Chapter 9. The judge rolled back employee wages.

In the late 1990s, a fire sprinkler broke in the basement of the district office, destroying many of the district's historic documents. District staff and local historians have been working ever since to rebuild the district archive.

By 2017, a high cost of living and housing shortage had contributed to the district's declining enrollment.

Over 164 years, San José Unified has supported 53 elementary schools, of which 26 remain active as of the 2017–2018 school year. Additionally, the district supports six comprehensive middle schools, six comprehensive high schools, a continuation high school, and an alternative education school.

List of schools

* Note: Based on data from the 2013-2014 school year

Transportation

San Jose Unified School District's bus fleet consists of the following 
Thomas Saf-T-Liner C2 Special needs (unknown amount) 
Thomas Saf-T-Liner HDX (unknown amount)

Historical fleet
Gen 4 Blue Bird All American RE 
Gen 2 Thomas Saf-T-Liner WestCoast-ER

References

Further reading 
   Excerpted from

External links

Merritt Trace Elementary School - Through the Years